Andrea Beghetto (born 11 October 1994) is an Italian professional footballer who plays as a midfielder for Italian  club Venezia, on loan from Pisa.

Club career

SPAL and Genoa
Beghetto began his career in Serie D, starting his career as a fullback or wingback, before switching to a winger, and later to a central midfielder. After a promising season with SPAL in the Serie B, wherein he was considered one of the strongest players, Berghetto transferred to Genoa in January 2017.

Frosinone
Beghetto transferred to Frosinone on 5 July 2017.

Pisa
On 31 January 2021 he moved to Pisa. The contract was technically a loan for the first 18 months, after which Pisa was obligated to purchase his rights on a permanent basis.

Alessandria, Perugia and Venezia
On 5 August 2021, he was loaned by Pisa to Alessandria. On 31 January 2022, Beghetto moved on a new loan to Perugia. On 30 August 2022, Beghetto returned to Perugia on a new loan. On 26 January 2023, Beghetto was loaned by Venezia.

Personal life
Andrea's grandfather Giuseppe is a former Olympic gold-medalist cyclist, his father Massimo is a former footballer and current footballing coach, and his uncle Luigi is a retired professional footballer.

References

External links

1994 births
Living people
Sportspeople from Perugia
Footballers from Umbria
Italian footballers
Genoa C.F.C. players
S.P.A.L. players
Frosinone Calcio players
Pisa S.C. players
U.S. Alessandria Calcio 1912 players
A.C. Perugia Calcio players
Venezia F.C. players
Association football midfielders
Serie A players
Serie B players
Serie C players
Serie D players